Lakeside Village may refer to:

Lakeside Village, Doncaster, an outlet shopping centre in Doncaster, South Yorkshire, England
Lakeside Village (Lakeland), an open-air shopping mall in Lakeland, Florida, United States
Lakeside Village, Kansas, an unincorporated community in Jefferson County, Kansas, United States
Lakeside Village, Oklahoma, a census-designated place in Comanche County, Oklahoma, United States
Lakeside Village, Virginia, an unincorporated community in Cumberland County, Virginia, United States

See also 
Lakeside (disambiguation)